The Uppland Runic Inscription 948  is a Viking Age runestone engraved in Old Norse with the Younger Futhark runic alphabet. It is in reddish grey granite and is located at the Fålebro bridge, sunk into the ground, near Danmark Church in Uppsala Municipality. The style is Pr4.

Inscription
Transliteration of the runes into Latin characters

 ' stʀþinkr × lit resa stin × iftʀ × arna × sun × sen × han × fyr × hayrt × lant × þelfi ' auk ' aurikia ' iuku ' runar ' iftʀ ' bruþur ' sin

Old Norse transcription:

 

English translation:

 "Styðingr/Stœðingr had the stone raised in memory of Árni, his son. He travelled to every land (?) Þjalfi and Órœkja cut the runes in memory of their brother. "

References

Runestones in Uppland